Virginia Harrison is a fictional character from the US NBC soap opera Sunset Beach, played by Dominique Jennings. Virginia is characterized as a "bad girl" and has been central to a controversial storyline in which she impregnates a fellow female character without their consent.

Character development
Jennings was cast into the role of Virginia after she auditioned for another part in the program. She was originally contracted to appear in ten episodes of the program. However, after her first day on set, Jennings was offered a three-year contract, which she accepted. In February 1999, it was announced that Sunset Beach had decided to end Jennings' contract with the serial, after they axed Virginia from the series. However, producers decided to not to kill her off and did not rule out a future return.

While the character is portrayed as "the bitch of the beach", Jennings said that Virginia has "depth and edge" to her. She described her as a single mother from South Central L.A., who is "trying to make a better life for her son" but making Vanessa and Michael's lives miserable in the process. She opined that Virginia's interest and appeal came through the fact she started out as a completely different character. Jennings also said that there was no other black female portraying such a villainess on daytime television during the nineties. She also had so much fun playing Virginia that she had to remind herself to "snap out" of character.

Virginia is subject to a storyline in which she drugs and impregnates love rival Vanessa Hart (Sherri Saum) with Tyus Robinson's (Russell Curry) sperm, using a turkey baster. In doing so Virginia hopes to win the heart of fellow character Michael Bourne (Jason Winston George). The storyline proved unpopular with some viewers. In another part of the storyline Virginia dresses up as her alter-ego "Nurse Jones" in an attempt to fool and run Vanessa's stay in the hospital. Jennings was required to wear a padded fat suit and a "whacked-out" wig. Jennings said "It's really old and itchy, and it's hard to tell I have it on with the nurse's uniform, because the costume is so boxy. It's not so much heavy as it is hot. And the wig is just kind of out there."

Storylines
Virginia is a person that fights for what she wants and she knows how to get it; she is a widow raising her son Jimmy and she relies on the help of Michael, the man that accidentally shot her husband in a gang war, when she learns of Michael developing a relationship with a reporter named Vanessa, she decides to fight for what she claims as hers and she infiltrates Michael's life in order to get rid of her, claiming that her neighborhood isn't safe because of constant robberies, Virginia gets Michael to give her a place to stay at Surf Central, a house where Michael lives with a number of his other friends, Virginia doesn't hide her feelings for Michael in front of Vanessa and she makes it clear that she wants Vanessa gone, when Michael explains that he sees Virginia only as a friend, Virginia refuses to back down and only becomes more keen on breaking up Michael and Vanessa. She follows Michael and Vanessa one day to the cabin where they arranged a private evening and sets the cabin on fire in order to prevent them from making love.

After Virginia successfully covering her tracks, she goes on a private New Year's Eve celebration with Michael, Vanessa and the rest of the Surf Central gang, where her life is put at risk when a serial killer is on the loose, Virginia gets a chance to get rid of Vanessa, but instead decides to help her out when they find themselves in harm's way, when they return to Sunset Beach, it appears that Virginia has finally given up on removing Vanessa from her life, but in reality Virginia is only faking a friendship, Virginia realizes that she needs to go to extreme measures to get rid of Vanessa and when she learns that Vanessa's mother is suffering from a rare genetic illness called Martin's Syndrome, she decides to use that info for her benefit, she goes to see a dark magic expert named Mrs. Moreau (Joyce Guy) who helps her make a potion that makes Vanessa believe that she has the illness. Vanessa leaves town in order not to hurt Michael and Virginia finally has her victory – that is, until Michael discovers that Vanessa hasn't really left town.

Virginia accidentally walks in on Vanessa and her doctor named Tyus in an embrace when they experiment with a drug that could cure Vanessa, and it gives her an idea on how to get rid of Vanessa once-and-for all, however, when the town is hit by an earthquake, Virginia thinks that her son Jimmy died and she is convinced that God is punishing her for her crimes, however, she covers her story, when she learns that Jimmy is alive, she then goes forward with her most evil plot ever – impregnating Vanessa with Tyus's sperm which she steals from a local sperm bank, she does so, using, of all things, a turkey baster and then blackmails Dr. Green into changing Vanessa's due date, Michael and Vanessa are finally broken up when Vanessa lies to Michael about who the father of the baby is and Virginia berates Vanessa for lying. Her world comes crumbling down when Michael investigates Dr. Green and overhears Virginia threatening him. Virginia confesses her crimes to Michael and Vanessa before being carted off to a mental institution of the criminally insane.

Reception
For her portrayal of Virginia, Jennings was nominated for "Outstanding Villainess" at the 15th annual Soap Opera Digest Awards in February 1999. Kathleen Morgan of the Daily Record said the turkey baster storyline was "incredible". While the Pittsburgh Post-Gazette included the storyline in their feature list of the most "over-the-top" in the history of soap opera. They added that "sticking it in another woman" was the most "outrageous" plot to ever feature in the genre. However, the storyline proved controversial with some viewers. Candace Havens of the Charleston Gazette-Mail said "It is certainly an uncomfortable storyline for viewers. Let's hope it ends soon". She also said that through the storyline, Sunset Beach showed how a "fledging soap opera" does not always "stick with what works" with viewers. Havens later opined that Virginia was characterized as a "bad girl". Sally Stone of the Portsmouth Daily Times said that Virginia delivered "a nasty Kodak moment" when she manipulated pictures of Vanessa and Tyus. Mike Turner of Soap Opera Weekly said that Virginia became the "bitch" of Sunset Beach. She was described in Upscale magazine as being "a lowdown and dirty gurl from da 'hood".

References

Sunset Beach characters
Television characters introduced in 1997
Fictional waiting staff
Fictional African-American people
Female villains